Spirit of Atlanta Drum and Bugle Corps is a World Class competitive drum and bugle corps, based in Atlanta, Georgia. Spirit of Atlanta is a member corps of Drum Corps International (DCI).

History
Sources:

1970s
With Freddy Martin as corps director, members were recruited. A program with no particular musical style was worked up, and Spirit of Atlanta was introduced to the drum corps public at contests in at least nine states in the South and Midwest.  At the 1977 DCI World Championships in Denver, Spirit finished twenty-third of forty-five corps.

A first year finish of twenty-third was respectable, but Spirit of Atlanta wanted more and an effort was made to secure the finest instructional staff possible.  Two new caption heads were hired; brass head Jim Ott from the DCI Champion Blue Devils and percussion head Tom Float from Toronto's Oakland Crusaders, a corps renowned for their drumming.  With these two hires,(along With Dave Bandy writing the drill, Russell Stanton teaching marching technique and cleaning, Patty Williams teaching flags and Margaret Ott teaching rifles) the core instructional group was in place which would take the corps to new heights.  Adopting a style that has been referred to as "Southern Jazz", Spirit stunned the drum corps world in 1978, vaulting into eighth place at DCI Prelims in Denver; then at Finals, the corps rose even higher, finishing in sixth place and losing the High Brass title to the Phantom Regiment by half of a tenth of a point. Both the brass and percussion were among the best in the drum corps activity, and Spirit moved up into a fourth-place finish at DCI in Birmingham, Alabama, in 1979, featuring the song that would become the corps' trademark tune, "Georgia on my Mind."

1980s
Tragedy struck Spirit while the corps was on tour in 1980.  When one of their vans was in a traffic accident on Interstate 55 near Grenada, Mississippi, brass arranger and caption head Jim Ott was killed.  Spirit's members and staff were devastated, but the corps recovered to honor Ott's memory by repeating their fourth-place finish at DCI Finals in Birmingham, AL. In 1980, the percussion line had the high execution score at finals and tied for the overall high percussion title.

Prior to the 1981 season, the corps lost its corporate sponsorship from WXIA.  Financial adjustments were made and the corps continued on. Following the loss of Jim Ott in the 1980 season new staff members were needed to fill the vacancies. For the summer of 1981, the drill designer was Steve Moore; horn caption heads included Gary Markham and Joel Schultz. Visual Designers were Freddy Martin and John Armstrong. The guard instructors brought in the varied talents of Julie Gilbert of the Crossmen, Cindy Anderson of the Guardsmen, and Robert S. Robinson of Jacksonville State University and Chapter V Winter Guard. Tom Float remained percussion caption head and Mike Back, who was a percussion instructor in 1980 returned to the staff. Spirit of Atlanta repeated the musical program of the 1980 season in 1981, with the exception of the concert number, hoping for higher levels of competitive success. This was not to be the case, as the corps finished in ninth place in 1981. The percussion was the highest scoring caption for the year, but Tom Float departed at the end of the 1981 season. At the end of 1982, the corps finished 12th place with the guard ranked 11th in their caption at DCI finals.

After two disappointing years competitively, in 1983 the corps rallied to a seventh-place finish behind the new visual staff of Sal Salas, Scott Chandler and Tam Easterwood along with longtime marching instructor Brad Carraway.

In 1984 the Spirit drumline under Mike Back made a run at the high percussion title as they were the "host corps" for the 1984 World Championships.

The 1985 corps saw Tam Easterwood and Scott Chandler's colorguard win the guard trophy, a feat they would repeat in 1987.

In 1986, the tenth competitive season of the corps, the "throwback" show of Southern blues, jazz and gospel earned them a sixth-place finish and an all-time high score for Spirit of Atlanta of 94.1 at the DCI Championships.

In 1988, after a disappointing competitive end to the 1987 season, a decision was made to turn away from jazz and blues to the classical idiom.  Although the corps' competitive placement improved from tenth to ninth place and scored in the 92's just weeks prior to finals, the classical show based on Stravinsky's "Petrushka" was panned by drum corps fans used to the high-powered brass and exciting shows for which Spirit had become known.

In 1989, Spirit dropped from finals for the first time since 1978.

1990s
In 1990 Spirit of Atlanta regained Finalist status, but their success would not last long. Financial and management challenges plagued the corps. From 1991 to 1993 the corps' competitive status declined. The financial problems culminated leading into the 1994 season, when the corps announced it would be inactive that summer.

The corps returned to the field in 1995, and began a long rebuilding process. These years would prove challenging, but saw some increased success as the corps progressed from 23rd place in 1996 to a regained semi-finalist status in 1997, and peaking at 14th place in 1998. The corps changed uniforms along the way to a navy blue top with cream pants.

Financial challenges would continue to hound the corps leading into the 2000 season, which saw a mid-summer management turnover and a difficult touring year. Nonetheless, the corps finished 15th, and a majority of the membership from that season would continue with the corps over the next 4 years.

2000s
In 2000, while the corps was rehearsing at JSU just prior to the start of tour, the corps director attempted to fold the drum corps. Due to a very strong response by corps alumni, parents, staff and other members of the drum corps community Spirit of Atlanta got through the season, finishing in fifteenth place at DCI Finals in College Park, Maryland. Following the management challenges of the 2000 season, Spirit of Atlanta re-organized in preparation for the summer of 2001. It officially relocated to Jacksonville, Alabama, and officially became known as "Spirit, from Jacksonville State University".  This relationship with the university provided a foundation of stability the corps had not experienced for more than a decade. The 2001 season saw a significantly more competitive drum corps finishing in 13th place while wearing baby blue uniforms again. In 2002, Spirit regained finalist status for the first time since 1990 finishing 10th overall - the highest placement since 1988.  Spirit from JSU would make DCI Finals again in 2003 and '05-07.  Going into the 2008 season the association with Jacksonville State University was essentially dissolved, resulting in a simplification of the corps' name to "Spirit Drum and Bugle Corps from Jacksonville, AL". The corps continued to operate out of Jacksonville, AL for the 2009 season.

2010s and Return to Atlanta
In 2010, the corps surprised the drum corps community by announcing its return to Atlanta. After the 2010 season, it was announced by the corps' Board of Directors that for the 2011 season, the corps would once again be known as "Spirit of Atlanta Drum and Bugle Corps." Spirit of Atlanta surged back into finals again in 2011, jumping from 16th place the preceding season to 12th at DCI Finals.

2020s 
Spirit of Atlanta did not participate in the 2020 season due to the COVID-19 pandemic. They returned in 2021 alongside many other corps in a non-competitive "DCI celebration tour". On January 9, 2022, the corps was placed on a 24-month probation for misconduct. On January 16, 2022, the corps released a joint statement with DCI stating they would not be fielding a corps in 2022 in order to reorganize and would return the following year. During the 2022 season, Spirit of Atlanta's board of directors worked alongside industry experts in youth safety, risk mitigation and management, and with other youth activity leaders to create a safety program called SpiritSAFE. This multipurpose awareness and training program looks to go beyond current programs such as SafeSport by giving in-depth education and training to adults and student performers, providing specific reporting policies, and new human resources and risk management policies. 

On July 27, 2022, Spirit of Atlanta confirmed their plans to return for the 2023 season in World Class Drum Corps International competition.

Show summary (1977–2022) 
Source:

Caption awards
At the annual World Championship Finals, Drum Corps International presents awards to the corps with the high average scores from prelims, semifinals, and finals in five captions. Prior to 2000 and the adoption of the current scoring format, Spirit of Atlanta won these captions:

High Color Guard Award
1985, 1987

References

External links
 Official website

Drum Corps International World Class corps
Musical groups established in 1976
1976 establishments in Georgia (U.S. state)